Regal Engagement (foaled on February, 2003 in Kentucky) is an American Thoroughbred racehorse. The daughter of Cat Thief and granddaughter of both Storm Cat and Forty Niner is probably remembered for her score in the mile and an eighth Grade II $250,000 Black-Eyed Susan Stakes at Pimlico Race Course on May 19, 2006.

Three-year-old season

In late 2005, Regal Engagement broke her maiden in her second race at Aqueduct Racetrack. She came back in February in the 1 1/16 mile (8.5 furlongs) Busher Stakes for three-year-old fillies, winning under jockey Ramon Dominguez in 1:47.15 (a very slow time). In mid-April, she placed second to Miraculous Miss in the grade two Comely Stakes at one mile at Aqueduct Racetrack.

Black-Eyed Susan Stakes 

Her connections skipped the Kentucky Oaks and entered the second jewel of America's de facto Filly Triple Crown, the Black-Eyed Susan Stakes. In the stretch, Regal Engagement drew even with pacesetter Smart N Pretty, who drifted out, bumping Regal Engagement before shaking her off to finish three lengths clear. The bumping incident drew a steward's inquiry and an objection by Regal Engagement's rider, Ramon Dominguez. The stewards disqualified Smart N Pretty and placed her second, awarding the victory to Regal Engagement. It was 2 lengths back to Baghdaria in third, while favorite She's an Eleven failed to rally and finished fifth.

Retirement

In 2007, Regal Engagement was retired and purchased at the Keeneland November sale. In 2008, she had a foal by A.P. Indy.

Pedigree

References

2003 racehorse births
Thoroughbred family 13-d
Racehorses bred in Kentucky
Racehorses trained in the United States